"2gether" is a song by Roger Sanchez and Far East Movement. The single features Kanobby. The track samples the song "Love Shack" by The B-52's. The original recording appears on the album Free Wired with a total run time of 3:05.

Music video
The music video for the song premiered on Vevo and YouTube on December 20, 2010. Girls Aloud star Sarah Harding makes an appearance in the video.

Track listing
Promo CD single
 "2gether" (Radio Edit) - 2:33
 "2gether" (Extended Mix) - 5:03

Digital download
 "2gether" (Radio Edit) - 2:31

2GETHER (Remixes)
 "2gether" (Radio Edit) - 2:35
 "2gether" (Extended Mix) - 5:06
 "2gether" (Pitron & Sanna Remix) - 7:26
 "2gether" (Sidney Samson Remix) - 6:22
 "2gether" (Antoine Clamaran Remix) - 8:03
 "2gether" (Cyantific & Wilkinson Remix) - 4:31
 "2gether" (Subscape Remix) - 5:14

Credits and personnel
 Lead vocals – Far East Movement & Kanobby
 Producers – Roger Sanchez
 Lyrics – Roger Sanchez, James Roh, Kevin Nishimura, Virman Coquia, Jae Choung, Jonathan Yip, Jeremy Reeves, Ray Romulus
 Label: Ultra Records

Charts

Release history

References

2011 singles
Far East Movement songs
Roger Sanchez songs
Songs written by Jonathan Yip
Songs written by Ray Romulus
Songs written by Jeremy Reeves
Songs written by Kate Pierson
Songs written by Cindy Wilson
Songs written by Fred Schneider
Songs written by Keith Strickland